Malawi and the United Kingdom have formal diplomatic relations. They are both Commonwealth countries.

History

British influence in modern-day Malawi began through a system of foreign influence when Nyasaland became a British protectorate under a colonial administration. The Queen of Great Britain became the Queen of Nyasaland. Nyasaland gained independence on 6 July 1964 and has since known as Malawi.

Post colonial relations

Malawi has had diplomatic relations with United Kingdom during the post-colonial era.

Cochrane-Dyet cable

Malawi and the UK found themselves in a diplomatic row in 2012 that resulted in the mutual expulsion of their envoys. Bingu wa Mutharika expelled British High Commissioner Fergus Cochrane-Dyet for calling him "arrogant" and "intolerant" after a leaked cable was published in The Nation newspaper. The United Kingdom in return expelled acting High Commissioner Flossie Gomile-Chidyaonga and revoked her invitation to the royal wedding of the Duke and Duchess of Cambridge. Relations were restored after Joyce Banda came into power.

See also

List of High Commissioners of the United Kingdom to Malawi
List of High Commissioners of Malawi to the United Kingdom

References

 
United Kingdom
Bilateral relations of the United Kingdom
Relations of colonizer and former colony
Malawi and the Commonwealth of Nations
United Kingdom and the Commonwealth of Nations